Wojciech Cezary Jagielski (born 15 September 1963 in Zduńska Wola) – Polish journalist working for radio and television, drummer, doctor of medicine by training.

Summary 
In 1992 he got a degree in Faculty of Medicine at the Medical University of Warsaw.

Radio

He was working for a Polish commercial station Radio ZET at the beginning as a DJ, then as a music supervisor (during the periods from 1995 to July 2007 and again during 2010 to 2015). He was hosting auditions like Słodka szesnastka Radia Zet (Radio Zet's Sweet Sixteen), Raz-dwa-trzy, śpiewasz ty (One, two, three now you sing), and along with Karolina Korwin Piotrowska – Mniej więcej serio (Kind of Seriously), Mniej więcej poniedziałek (Kind of Monday). He interviewed more than 350 prominent people from all over the world including pop musicians, celebrities from cinematography and media. From April 2012 to May 2015 he hosted an audition in Radio Zet called Doktor Zet.

Television

He began his work for the television RTL 7, where he hosted Wieczór z Wampirem then after the change of its formula Wieczór z Jagielskim what was emitted from 1999 in TVP2. In 2006 along with Kazimiera Szczuka he co-hosted a talk show for TVN  Dwururka. With Ewelina Kopic he hosted a Game show Zakręcony tydzień (A Crazy Week), which was the first satire show that took a look at news in Poland. From September 2007 to June 2010 along with Jolanta Pieńkowska he co-hosted morning show  Dzień Dobry TVN. From 3 September August 2012 along with Beata Sadowska he co-hosted another morning broadcast Pytanie na Śniadanie TVP2. He sat in jury of first and third edition of Polish version of talent show Clash of the Choirs (Bitwa na głosy) From January 2014 he hosts a programme Wojtek Jagielski na żywo (Wojtek Jagielski live) in Superstation TV.

Musical career

In the 80's he co-founded and played as a drummer for Polish bands Kontrola W. and Kosmetyki Mrs. Pinki (an author of the lyrics of a song "Miłość na polu minowym"). With both of the bands he took part in numerous editions of Jarocin Festival (from periods 1982 to 1983 and 1985 to 1986). Sporadically he plays drums for a band called Poparzeni Kawą trzy

Filmography 
 1999: Świat według Kiepskich – as priest Krtęć
 2006: Na Wspólnej – as a journalist
 2008: Karolcia – as a truck driver
 2008: Niania – as a TV presenter
 2009: 39 i pół – as himself

References 

1963 births
Living people
Polish journalists
People from Zduńska Wola
Medical University of Warsaw alumni
RTL Group people
Polish DJs